John Purdy (born 1948 in Tullylish, County Down) is a former Irish sportsman. He played Gaelic football with his local club Lawrencetown and was a member of the Down senior inter-county team from the 1960s until the 1970s, winning an All-Ireland medal in 1968.

References

1948 births
Living people
Down inter-county Gaelic footballers
Lawrencetown Gaelic footballers